The Bava Park Is a sports center located between Bava Street and Bisini Road in the city of Port Moresby, the capital of Papua New Guinea. It is generally used for soccer and rugby matches. It has a capacity to receive 5,000 spectators.

It was one of the four venues that was chosen by FIFA that received matches for the 2016 FIFA U-20 Women's World Cup. In the stadium were played 4 of the matches of group B and one of the group C and D.

References

External links
Map in Wikimapia

Sports venues in Papua New Guinea
Football venues in Papua New Guinea
Athletics (track and field) venues in Papua New Guinea
Buildings and structures in Port Moresby
Rugby league stadiums in Papua New Guinea